Bandar Cassia or Cassia City is a township in South Seberang Perai District, Penang, Malaysia. The township was developed by the Penang Development Corporation (PDC, PERDA) in 1993.

References 

 

Populated places in Penang
South Seberang Perai District